The 2019 Cork Junior A Football Championship was the 121st staging of the Cork Junior A Football Championship since its establishment by the Cork County Board in 1895. The championship draw took place on 2 September 2019. The championship began on 15 September 2019 and ended on 10 November 2019.

On 10 November 2019, Kilshannig won the championship after a 0-22 to 0-11 defeat of St James' in the final at Páirc Uí Rinn.  This was their third championship title overall and their first title since 1996.

St James' Alan O'Shea was the championship's top scorer with 0-17.

Qualification

Results

Round 1

Quarter-finals

Semi-finals

Final

Championship statistics

Top scorers

Overall

In a single game

References

External links
 2019 Cork JAFC results

Cork Junior Football Championship